The 2013–14 QMJHL season is the 45th season of the Quebec Major Junior Hockey League (QMJHL). The regular season consisted of 18 teams playing 68 games each, beginning on September 12, 2013, and ending on March 15, 2014.

Team changes
The P.E.I. Rocket were renamed to the Charlottetown Islanders during the off-season.

Regular season standings

Note: GP = Games played; W = Wins; L = Losses; OTL = Overtime losses; SL = Shootout losses; GF = Goals for; GA = Goals against; PTS = Points; x = clinched playoff berth; y = clinched division title

Scoring leaders
Note: GP = Games played; G = Goals; A = Assists; Pts = Points; PIM = Penalty minutes

Leading goaltenders
Note: GP = Games played; Mins = Minutes played; W = Wins; L = Losses: OTL = Overtime losses; SL = Shootout losses; GA = Goals Allowed; SO = Shutouts; GAA = Goals against average

2014 President's Cup playoffs

First round

(1) Baie-Comeau Drakkar vs. (16) Shawinigan Cataractes

(2) Halifax Mooseheads vs. (15) Charlottetown Islanders

(3) Val-d'Or Foreurs vs. (14) Acadie-Bathurst Titan

(4) Rimouski Océanic vs. (13) Chicoutimi Saguenéens

(5) Blainville-Boisbriand Armada vs. (12) Moncton Wildcats

(6) Drummondville Voltigeurs vs. (11) Victoriaville Tigres

(7) Quebec Remparts vs. (10) Rouyn-Noranda Huskies

(8) Gatineau Olympiques vs. (9) Cape Breton Screaming Eagles

Quarter-finals

(1) Baie-Comeau Drakkar Vs. (10) Rouyn-Noranda Huskies

(2) Halifax Mooseheads Vs. (8) Gatineau Olympiques

(3) Val-d'Or Foreurs Vs. (6) Drummondville Voltigeurs

(4) Rimouski Océanic Vs. (5) Blainville-Boisbriand Armada

Semi-finals

(1) Baie-Comeau Drakkar Vs. (5) Blainville-Boisbriand Armada

(2) Halifax Mooseheads Vs. (3) Val-d'Or Foreurs

Presidents Cup Finals

(1) Baie-Comeau Drakkar Vs. (3) Val-d'Or Foreurs

Playoff scoring leaders
Note: GP = Games played; G = Goals; A = Assists; Pts = Points; PIM = Penalty minutes

Playoff leading goaltenders

Note: GP = Games played; Mins = Minutes played; W = Wins; L = Losses: OTL = Overtime losses; SL = Shootout losses; GA = Goals Allowed; SO = Shutouts; GAA = Goals against average

Memorial Cup

Trophies and awards
Team
President's Cup – Playoff Champions: Val-d'Or Foreurs
Jean Rougeau Trophy – Regular Season Champions: Baie-Comeau Drakkar
Luc Robitaille Trophy – Team that scored the most goals: Val-d'Or Foreurs
Robert Lebel Trophy – Team with best GAA: Baie-Comeau Drakkar

Player
Michel Brière Memorial Trophy – Most Valuable Player: Anthony Mantha, Val-d'Or Foreurs
Jean Béliveau Trophy – Top Scorer: Anthony Mantha, Val-d'Or Foreurs
Guy Lafleur Trophy – Playoff MVP: Antoine Bibeau, Val-d'Or Foreurs
Jacques Plante Memorial Trophy – Top Goaltender: Zachary Fucale, Halifax Mooseheads
Guy Carbonneau Trophy – Best Defensive Forward: Félix Girard, Baie-Comeau Drakkar
Emile Bouchard Trophy – Defenceman of the Year: Guillaume Gélinas, Val-d'Or Foreurs
Kevin Lowe Trophy – Best Defensive Defenceman: Justin Hache, Cape Breton Screaming Eagles
Mike Bossy Trophy – Top Prospect: Nikolaj Ehlers, Halifax Mooseheads
RDS Cup – Rookie of the Year: Nikolaj Ehlers, Halifax Mooseheads
Michel Bergeron Trophy – Offensive Rookie of the Year: Nikolaj Ehlers, Halifax Mooseheads
Raymond Lagacé Trophy – Defensive Rookie of the Year: Jérémy Roy, Sherbrooke Phoenix
Frank J. Selke Memorial Trophy – Most sportsmanlike player: Frédérick Gaudreau, Drummondville Voltigeurs/Shawinigan Cataractes
QMJHL Humanitarian of the Year – Humanitarian of the Year: Charles-David Beaudoin, Drummondville Voltigeurs
Marcel Robert Trophy – Best Scholastic Player: Jérémy Grégoire, Baie-Comeau Drakkar
Paul Dumont Trophy – Personality of the Year: Zachary Fucale, Halifax Mooseheads

Executive
Ron Lapointe Trophy – Coach of the Year: Éric Veilleux, Baie-Comeau Drakkar
Maurice Filion Trophy – General Manager of the Year: Steve Ahern, Baie-Comeau Drakkar
John Horman Trophy – Executive of the Year: 
Jean Sawyer Trophy – Marketing Director of the Year:

All-Star Teams 
First All-Star Team:
 Philippe Cadorette, Goaltender, Baie-Comeau Drakkar
 Guillaume Gélinas, Defenceman, Val-d'Or Foreurs
 Randy Gazzola, Defenceman, Val-d'Or Foreurs
 Jonathan Drouin, Centre, Halifax Mooseheads
 Anthony Duclair, Left Wing, Quebec Remparts
 Anthony Mantha, Right Wing, Val-d'Or Foreurs

Second All-Star Team:
 Zachary Fucale, Goaltender, Halifax Mooseheads
 Justin Hache, Defenceman, Cape Breton Screaming Eagles
 MacKenzie Weegar, Defenceman, Halifax Mooseheads
 Cameron Darcy, Centre, Cape Breton Screaming Eagles
 Nikolaj Ehlers, Left Wing, Halifax Mooseheads
 Marcus Power, Right Wing, Rouyn-Noranda Huskies

All-Rookie Team:
 Callum Booth, Goaltender, Quebec Remparts
 Jérémy Roy, Defenceman, Sherbrooke Phoenix
 Nicolas Meloche, Defenceman, Baie-Comeau Drakkar
 Alexandre Goulet, Centre, Charlottetown Islanders
 Nikolaj Ehlers, Left Wing, Halifax Mooseheads
 Daniel Sprong, Right Wing, Charlottetown Islanders

See also
 List of QMJHL seasons
 2013 in ice hockey
 2013–14 OHL season
 2013–14 WHL season
 2014 in ice hockey
 2014 Memorial Cup

References

External links
 Official QMJHL website
 Official CHL website
 Official website of the Subway Super Series

Quebec Major Junior Hockey League seasons
Qmjhl